This list is of Japanese structures dating from the Nara period (710–794) that have been designated Important Cultural Properties (including *National Treasures). Twenty-three surviving sites with the same number of component structures have been so designated. All but three are National Treasures and all but one is in Nara Prefecture. Fourteen are located in the city of Nara; those at Tōdai-ji, Gangō-ji, Tōshōdai-ji, and Yakushi-ji form part of the UNESCO World Heritage Site Historic Monuments of Ancient Nara. Six are at Hōryū-ji, part of the World Heritage Site Buddhist Monuments in the Hōryū-ji Area.

Structures

See also

 Cultural Properties of Japan
 Japanese Buddhist architecture
 List of Important Cultural Properties of Japan (Asuka period: structures)
 List of Important Cultural Properties of Japan (Heian period: structures)

References

Nara period
Important Cultural Properties of Japan
Architecture in Japan